Bodast (also known as Canto) were a late 1960s rock group from London, England. Its most notable member was Steve Howe, later to join the progressive rock band Yes. Members were Clive Skinner on guitar and vocals, Dave Curtiss on bass and Bobbie Clarke on drums. The name of the group came from the first two letters of the members' first names: BObbie, DAve, STeve.

The group recorded an album for Tetragrammaton Records in 1968. The label had success in the United States with Deep Purple, but went out of business just before the scheduled release date for the Bodast album.  

A portion of a song from the Bodast album titled "Nether Street" was renamed "Würm" and was re-used as part of the song "Starship Trooper" from The Yes Album in 1971. Howe says fragments of songs he was working on for Bodast also turned up later in Yes's "South Side of the Sky", "Close to the Edge" and Asia's "One Step Closer", from that band's debut album.  

The 1968 Bodast recordings were eventually released in 1981, and most recently by RPM Records in 2000. Bassist Dave Curtiss later formed a folk duo with Clive Maldoon (born Clive Skinner) called Curtiss Maldoon in 1971. They have recorded two albums, the first simply called Curtiss Maldoon in October 1971 and Steve Howe played on two songs on that one, and the second Maldoon in November 1973.

Discography
The Bodast Tapes - Featuring Steve Howe (1981 Cherry Red – BRED 12) 
The Early Years (Steve Howe with Bodast - printed in France, 1988 & 1990)
Spectral Nether Street: The Complete Collection (RPM Records, 2000)
Towards Utopia (2017 Esoteric Recordings – ECLEC 2593)

References

External links

[ AllMusic review of  Spectral Nether Street: The Complete Collection]

English psychedelic rock music groups
Musical groups established in 1968